2 Chronicles 8 is the eighth chapter of the Second Book of Chronicles the Old Testament in the Christian Bible or of the second part of the Books of Chronicles in the Hebrew Bible. The book is compiled from older sources by an unknown person or group, designated by modern scholars as "the Chronicler", and had the final shape established in late fifth or fourth century BCE. This chapter belongs to the section focusing on the kingship of Solomon (2 Chronicles 1 to 9). The focus of this chapter is Solomon's other building projects and commercial efforts.

Text
This chapter was originally written in the Hebrew language and is divided into 18 verses.

Textual witnesses
Some early manuscripts containing the text of this chapter in Hebrew are of the Masoretic Text, which includes the Aleppo Codex (10th century) and Codex Leningradensis (1008.

There is also a translation into Koine Greek known as the Septuagint, made in the last few centuries BCE. Extant ancient manuscripts of the Septuagint version include Codex Vaticanus (B; B; 4th century), and Codex Alexandrinus (A; A; 5th century).

Old Testament references
:

Solomon's other building projects (8:1–11)
This section reports that Solomon received additional cities from Hiram the king of Tyre, whereas reported in 1 Kings 9, Solomon gave Hiram 20 cities, probably in exchange. The remaining population of non-Israelites were
employed as slave workers by Solomon, with Israelites as guards exempted from the works. Solomon was proud to have Pharaoh's daughter as his wife, so he built her a special house, also that she, as a woman (and foreigner), was not to come into contact with holy things.

Verse 1
And it came to pass at the end of twenty years, wherein Solomon had built the house of the Lord, and his own house,
 "Twenty years": is counted from the fourth year of Solomon's reign, when he began to build the house of the Lord (the Temple) for seven years, then 13 years in finishing and furnishing it, while at the same time he also built and furnished his own palace.

Verse 2
that the cities which Hiram had given to Solomon, Solomon built them; and he settled the children of Israel there.
"Hiram": Hebrew: "Huram" as in 2 Chronicles 2:3; 2 Chronicles 8:18), which is a variant spelling referring to the same individual. Some medieval Hebrew mss, along with the Greek Septuagint, Syriac, and Latin Vulgate spell the name "Hiram", as with 1 Chronicles 14:1.

Verse 3
And Solomon went to Hamath Zobah and seized it.
 "Hamath Zobah": were known as two separate kingdoms in Syria.

Verse 4
'And he built Tadmor in the wilderness, and all the store cities, which he built in Hamath.''
 "Tadmor": later known as "Palmyra", was an important oasis in the desert of Syria, c.  northeast of Damascus. This showed the extent of Solomon's control to the north.

Public worship established at the Temple (8:12–16)
The passage details how Solomon kept the commandments of Moses in offerings and David's ordinances in the appointments of priests and Levites. The three annual festivals are named here, along with the daily sacrifices as well as for sabbath and the new moons.

Solomon's fleet (8:17–18)
This part parallels 1 Kings 9:26-28, with "the sea" refers to the Red Sea.

See also

Related Bible parts: Exodus 34, Leviticus 23, 1 Kings 7, 1 Kings 8, 1 Kings 9, 1 Chronicles 22, 1 Chronicles 28

Notes

References

Sources

External links
 Jewish translations:
 Divrei Hayamim II - II Chronicles - Chapter 8 (Judaica Press) in Hebrew and English translation [with Rashi's commentary] at Chabad.org
 Christian translations:
 Online Bible at GospelHall.org (ESV, KJV, Darby, American Standard Version, Bible in Basic English)
 2 Chronicles Chapter 8. Bible Gateway

08